Disco Fever is the eighth album by the Los Angeles, California-based R&B group the Sylvers, released in 1979. This was their second and last album for Casablanca Records.

Track listing
"Mahogany"  (Gerry Goffin, Mike Masser) – 5:10
"Is Everybody Happy"  (Al Ross, Edmund Sylvers, Harold Faltermeyer) – 3:55
"Come and Stay All Night"  (Al Ross, Edmund Sylvers, Moll, Wisnet) – 2:51
"Dancing Right Now"  (Al Ross, Edmund Sylvers, Harold Faltermeyer) – 5:38
"Gimme Gimme Your Lovin'"  (Geoff Bastow, Pete Bellotte) – 4:36
"I Feel So Good Tonight" (Al Ross, Edmund Sylvers, Moll, Wisnet) – 3:43 
"Hoochie Coochie Dancin'" (Geoff Bastow, Pete Bellotte) – 3:41
"Forever"  (Giorgio Moroder, Pete Bellotte) – 4:15

Personnel
The Sylvers – backing vocals
Les Hurdle – bass
Keith Forsey – drums, percussion
Mats Bjoerklund – guitar
Harold Faltermeyer – keyboards, synthesizer
Gary Herbig – saxophone
Sid Sharp – strings, concertmaster
Bill Reichenbach, Dick "Slide" Hyde – trombone
Alan Vizzutti, Gary Grant, Steve Madaio – trumpet

References

External links
 Disco Fever at Discogs

1979 albums
The Sylvers albums
Albums produced by Giorgio Moroder
Casablanca Records albums